Udara Rathnayake is an actor in Sri Lankan cinema and television as well as a businessman and politician by profession. He is most notable for the roles in films Ira Handa Yata and Nela directed by his father.

Personal life 
He was born on 21 June 1986 as the second of the family. His father Bennett Rathnayake is a veteran film director who has produced several critically acclaimed award-winning films. His mother Samanmalee Hawapanna is a film producer. Udara has one elder sister, Erandathi; and one younger sister, Bhagya, both are actresses.

He also served as the Vice President of the Young Professionals Forum. Before entering cinema, he was engaged in business activities related to export sector. Udara is married to Dinali, the daughter of Priyantha Kariyapperuma, the former Director General of the Telecommunications Regulatory Commission. The wedding was celebrated on 30 November 2015. The couple has one son, Dishen.

Educated at D. S. Senanayake College and then Stafford International School, Rathnayake did his Undergraduate in the UK at the University of Essex in Business Management. Upon completing his degree he returned to Sri Lanka he completed a master's degree in Development and Politics at the University of Colombo.

Acting career 

Udara started his career as an actor, with many lead roles in Sinhala Teledramas, Udara also acted in movies, with the lead role in the movie Ira Handa Yata. It is for this role that he was nominated for the best performance at Singapore Film Festival.

Political career 
He is a graduate of University of Essex and University of Colombo. He won a seat on the Western Provincial Council after running for election in the Western Province Council Elections in 2014 under the United National Party.

He is a founding member of Sri Lanka United and currently serving as the Vice President of the United National Party-affiliated Young Professionals Association.  He ran for the 2014 Western Provincial Council elections under the United National Party.
On 29 March 2014 Udara Rathnayake was elected into the Western Provincial Council of Sri Lanka.

Filmography

References

External links
 Udara Rathnayake Wedding day

Living people
United National Party politicians
Alumni of the University of Essex
Sinhalese businesspeople
Members of the Western Provincial Council
Provincial councillors of Sri Lanka
20th-century Sri Lankan actors
21st-century Sri Lankan male actors
1986 births